Hugo Keenan (born 18 June 1996) is an Irish rugby union player. He plays as a fullback or wing with Leinster Rugby, and with the Ireland national rugby union team. He also formerly played fly-half for the Ireland national rugby sevens team.

Youth rugby
Keenan attended secondary school at Blackrock College. There he was a member of the team that won the 2014 Leinster Schools Senior Cup, with Keenan noted for his running and passing, including scoring a try in the final.

Leinster Rugby

Keenan debuted for Leinster in 2016 against Zebre.

Ireland national teams

Youth and sevens
Keenan played wing for the Ireland under-20 national rugby union team. Keenan started all matches for the Ireland under-20 team during the 2016 under-20 Six Nations. He also started all matches in the 2016 World Rugby under-20 Championship, including Ireland's historic victory over New Zealand.

Keenan was called into the Ireland national rugby sevens team camp in early 2017. Keenan was part of the Ireland sevens team during the 2017 Grand Prix Series. He scored several tries during Ireland's win at the 2017 Moscow Sevens, including a crucial try in Ireland's 28–21 semifinal win over Russia.

Senior team

Keenan debuted for Ireland on 24 October 2020 in a Six Nations match against Italy, where he started on the wing and scored two tries in a 50-17 win. 
Keenan then started Ireland's next 17 internationals (2020-2022), scoring tries against Georgia, Italy, USA, England and New Zealand.
Keenan was recognized for his strong performance in Ireland’s win against England in the 2022 Six Nations. Keenan was described in March 2022 as the heir to Rob Kearney at fullback for Ireland.

International tries 
As of 18 March 2023

References

External links

Leinster Profile
Pro14 Profile

1996 births
Irish rugby union players
Living people
Ireland international rugby sevens players
University College Dublin R.F.C. players
Leinster Rugby players
People educated at Blackrock College
Rugby union wings
Rugby union players from Dublin (city)
Rugby union fullbacks
Ireland international rugby union players